Yajnaseni is another name for Draupadi in the Sanskrit epic Mahabharat.

Yajnaseni may also refer to:

 Yajnaseni (play), 2016 Nepali-language play by Suman Pokhrel
 Yajnaseni (novel), 1984 Odia-language novel by Pratibha Ray